Fireworks is a 1954 West German period musical comedy film directed by Kurt Hoffmann and starring Lilli Palmer, Karl Schönböck, and Romy Schneider. Palmer's rendition of the song "O mein Papa" became a major hit. It was Palmer's debut film in her native Germany, having spent many years in exile in Britain, and launched her career as a major star in the country.

The film is based on the 1950 stage musical Das Feuerwerk partly written by Erik Charell. It was made at the Bavaria Studios in Munich and on location in Switzerland. The film's sets were designed by the art director Werner Schlichting.

It is a circus film set at the beginning of the twentieth century.

Cast

References

Bibliography

External links

1954 films
West German films
1954 musical comedy films
German musical comedy films
1950s German-language films
Circus films
German films based on plays
Films based on operettas
Films directed by Kurt Hoffmann
Films set in the 1900s
1950s German films
Films shot at Bavaria Studios
German historical films
1950s historical films